Ford Motors Football Club was an English association football club. They competed in the West Cheshire Association Football League and reached the 4th round of the FA Vase in 1985.

They resigned from the West Cheshire League in September 2019 due to their manager resigning and a number of players leaving the club.

References

Football clubs in England
Defunct football clubs in Cheshire
Association football clubs disestablished in 2019
Association football clubs established in 1962
Works association football teams in England
North West Counties Football League clubs
West Cheshire Association Football League clubs
Cheshire County League clubs